Dumb Money is an upcoming American biographical comedy-drama film directed by Craig Gillespie, from a script by Lauren Schuker Blum and Rebecca Angelo, based on the book The Antisocial Network: The GameStop Short Squeeze and the Ragtag Group of Amateur Traders That Brought Wall Street to Its Knees by Ben Mezrich. The film chronicles the GameStop short squeeze from January 2021, and stars an ensemble cast featuring Paul Dano, Sebastian Stan, Seth Rogen, and Pete Davidson. Teddy Schwarzman, Aaron Ryder, and Gillespie are producing the project. The film will be released theatrically on October 20, 2023, by Stage 6 Films and Sony Pictures Releasing.

Premise
"Based on the true story of a group of rag-tag investors from the Reddit page called Wall Street Bets, who banded together to put the squeeze on at least two hedge funds that had bet that GameStop shares would fall."

Cast

Production

Development
In January 2021, it was announced that Metro-Goldwyn-Mayer Pictures had bought the rights to a book proposal by Ben Mezrich about the then-recent GameStop short squeeze, entitled The Antisocial Network, with producers Michael De Luca, who also produced The Social Network (2010), the film adaptation of Mezrich's novel The Accidental Billionaires, and Aaron Ryder attached. In May 2021, Lauren Schuker Blum and Rebecca Angelo were announced to write the screenplay, with Cameron and Tyler Winklevoss (who were subjects in The Accidental Billionares and The Social Network) executive producing. In April 2022, Craig Gillespie signed on as director, with the intention of filming to start later that year around summer or fall. In September, it was announced that the film was retitled to Dumb Money, and production was set to commence in October, with De Luca and MGM dropping out, while Black Bear Pictures acquired financing and was scheduled to seek buyers at the annual Toronto International Film Festival. In October 2022, Sony Pictures, who were involved with The Social Network, bought the domestic and select international distribution rights to the film.

Casting
In September 2022, Paul Dano, Seth Rogen, Sebastian Stan and Pete Davidson were set to star; Rogen and Stan previously collaborated with Gillespie on the miniseries Pam & Tommy (2022), with Stan also having starred in Gillespie's film I, Tonya (2017). The following month, Shailene Woodley, Anthony Ramos, Vincent D'Onofrio, Dane DeHaan, Myha'la Herrold, America Ferrera, Rushi Kota, Nick Offerman, and Talia Ryder joined the cast.

Filming
Principal photography began in October 2022.

Release
Dumb Money is set to be released theatrically in the United States by Sony Pictures Releasing under the Stage 6 Films label, while Sony, Black Bear International and other indie distributors will be releasing internationally. The film was initially set to be distributed by United Artists Releasing when MGM was attached. A release date has been set of October 20, 2023.

References

External links
 

American biographical films
American business films
American drama films
Biographical films about businesspeople
Biographical films about computer and internet entrepreneurs
Black Bear Pictures films
Drama films based on actual events
Films about social media
Films about technological impact
Films about the Internet
Films based on non-fiction books
Sony Pictures films
Upcoming films
Wall Street films